The Hebridean is a breed of small black sheep from Scotland, similar to other members of the Northern European short-tailed sheep group, having a short, triangular tail. They often have two pairs of horns. They were often formerly known as "St Kilda" sheep, although unlike Soay and Boreray sheep they are probably not in fact from the St Kilda archipelago.

Characteristics

Modern Hebrideans have black, rather coarse wool, which fades to brown in the sun and often becomes grey with age; there is no wool on the face or legs. If not shorn the wool may moult naturally in spring. Rams and ewes typically have one pair of horns, but often have two or even more pairs (polycerate), and occasionally none.
Hebrideans are hardy and able to thrive on rough grazing, and so are often used as conservation grazing animals to maintain natural grassland or heathland habitats. They are particularly effective at scrub control, having a strong preference for browsing.

History

The sheep kept throughout Britain up to the Iron Age were small, short-tailed, and varied in colour. These survived into the 19th century in the Highlands and Islands as the Scottish Dunface, which had various local varieties, most of which are now extinct (some do survive, such as the Shetland and North Ronaldsay). The Dunfaces kept in the Hebrides were very small, with white faces and legs; their bodies were usually white, but often black, brown, russet or grey. The fleece was short and soft and they were typically horned in both sexes, many of them having two or even three pairs of horns. The Dunface was gradually replaced with long-tailed breeds such as the Scottish Blackface and Cheviot; it died out on the mainland and eventually also on the Hebridean islands.

The ancestors of Hebridean sheep were exported from St Kilda and were known as 'St Kildas' in the 19th century, being kept in the parks of wealthy and aristocratic landowners in Britain. Early owners included the Marquess of Breadalbane of Taymouth Castle in the 1840s and 1850s<Inverness Courier 6 October 1853, Northern Warder 1 October 1846>, Sir John Orde at Kilmory (Argyllshire) and Mark Milbank at Thorp Perrow (North Yorkshire) from the 1850s < A Fleming, 'Hiding in plain sight: St Kilda's other race of "ancient sheep", Agricultural History Review 70, II (2022), pp 269-92; Kinsman D. (2001), Black Sheep of Windermere: A History of the St Kilda or Hebridean Sheep. Windy Hall Publications. pp 101–144, 206>. They were successfully bred to black, though some 19th century St Kildas were more variegated <Kinsman 2001, Fig. 4.3>. In 1906 John Guille Millais re-christened these sheep 'Hebrideans', asserting that they were 'a deteriorated variety of the Hebridean sheep'; his classification thus lumped them with sheep known as Hebrideans which were kept by a very small number of owners in the late 19th century. In 1912 Lydekker claimed that St Kildas were 'of uncertain and mixed origin'; scepticism and denial about their St Kilda origins has continued ever since< Fleming  2022, p. 285>. Four of the 19th century St Kilda flocks survive, at Weston Park (Staffordshire), Tatton Park (Cheshire) Harewood House and Kirk Hammerton (North Yorkshire).       

In 1973 the ornamental Hebrideans were identified by the Rare Breeds Survival Trust as being in need of conservation. Since then the breed has been revived, and it is no longer regarded as rare; it is kept in many parts of the world, now including its native Hebrides.

See also
Icelandic sheep
Jacob sheep
Manx Loaghtan
Rare breed (agriculture)

References

External links

Hebridean Sheep Society
Hebridean Sheep at Oklahoma State University. 
Hebridean by Susan Schoenian, Sheep & Goat Specialist at the University of Maryland's Western Maryland Research & Education Center.

Hebrides
Sheep breeds
Sheep breeds originating in Scotland